Wynn Macau is a luxury hotel and casino resort in the Macau Special Administrative Region of the People's Republic of China with two towers containing a total of 1,008 rooms and suites, approximately  of casino space, over  of retail space, eight casual and fine dining restaurants, two spas, a salon and a pool.

Wynn Macau is operated by international resort developer Wynn Resorts.

Wynn Macau opened on 6 September 2006 and its second tower, Encore, opened on 21 April 2010.

History 

Wynn Macau opened to the public on 6 September 2006.

In December 2007, Wynn Macau completed an expansion, adding more gaming space and additional food and beverage and retail shops.

In 2009, Wynn Macau became one of only five hotels in Asia to receive the Forbes Five-Star award.

In 2016, Wynn Macau became the only resort worldwide with eight independent Forbes Five-Star awards, a title it currently holds.

Second Tower Expansion
On 21 April 2010, the company opened Encore at Wynn Macau, an all-suite boutique hotel, which is fully integrated into the existing operations at Wynn Macau similar to Encore Las Vegas. Encore Macau has 410 suites, including 41 Grand Salon Suites, bringing the total number of rooms at Wynn Macau to 1,008.

Cotai

On 1 May 2012, Wynn Macau received approval from the Macau government for its Cotai land concession, paving the way for Wynn Macau to break ground on the 51-acre site.

Wynn Macau Limited acquired a group of Jiaqing period (1796-1820) porcelain vases at a Christie's London auction on 7 July 2011. The vases were purchased for £8 million ($12.8 million). "We are delighted to return works of this extraordinary quality to the city of Macau and the People’s Republic of China," Roger Thomas, executive vice president of Design for Wynn Design and Development, said after the sale.

The Qing dynasty vases were on display at Wynn Palace and a sixteenth-century Louis XIV Beauvais Chinoiserie tapestry of 'The Emperor on a Journey,' is on display at Wynn Macau. Other art at Wynn Macau includes a Louis Rigal drawing, Macanese silk embroidery, a Louis XIV silk tapestry, two cloisonné camels, and Ming Dynasty statuary.

See also
 List of Macau casinos
 Macau gaming law
 Gambling in Macau
 Wynn Palace

References

External links

 Wynn Macau Resort
 Wynn Macau opens – MSNBC – AP

Casinos completed in 2006
Hotels established in 2006
Hotel buildings completed in 2006
Casinos in Macau
Resorts in Macau
Hotels in Macau
Sé, Macau
Companies listed on the Hong Kong Stock Exchange
2006 establishments in Macau
Steve Wynn